Pristimantis toftae is a species of frog in the family Strabomantidae.
It is found in Bolivia, Brazil, and Peru.
Its natural habitat is tropical moist lowland forests.
It is threatened by habitat loss.

References

toftae
Amphibians of Bolivia
Amphibians of Brazil
Amphibians of Peru
Amphibians described in 1978
Taxonomy articles created by Polbot